Victor Kilasu Massamba (24 November 1948 – 25 June 2020) was a Congolese football midfielder who played for Zaire in the 1974 FIFA World Cup. He also played for AS Dragons.

References

External links
FIFA profile

Democratic Republic of the Congo footballers
Democratic Republic of the Congo international footballers
Association football midfielders
AS Dragons players
1974 FIFA World Cup players
1972 African Cup of Nations players
1976 African Cup of Nations players
1950 births
2020 deaths
21st-century Democratic Republic of the Congo people